A referendum on the formation of the United Arab Republic and appointing Gamal Abdel Nasser as its president was held in Syria on 21 February 1958, alongside a simultaneous referendum in Egypt. The formation of the UAR was approved by 100% of voters, with only 139 voting against, whilst Nasser was approved as president by a similar margin.

Results

Formation of the United Arab Republic

Gamal Abdel Nasser as president

References

1958 in Syria
Syria
Egypt–Syria relations
Referendums in the United Arab Republic